Kamaruzaman Mohamad (1961 — April 28, 2014) was a Malaysian journalist and editor for Utusan Malaysia.

In 2000, Mohamad won the Kajai Award for being the first Malaysian journalist to penetrate the Militant Islamist separatist group Abu Sayyaf.

Mohamad died on April 28, 2014 at Subang Jaya Medical Centre from a kidney ailment.  He was 53.

References

1961 births
2014 deaths
Malaysian journalists
Deaths from kidney disease